The Little Rocky Mountains, also known as the Little Rockies,  are a group of buttes, roughly 765 km2 in area, located towards the southern end of the Fort Belknap Indian Reservation in Blaine County and Phillips County in north-central Montana.  Their highest summit is Antoine Butte (~5720 ft (1743 m)).

The nearest town is Dodson, Montana.

See also
 List of mountain ranges in Montana

Notes

External links

 Geology and Physiography of the Little Rocky Mountains, Carleton University, Ottawa, Ontario, Canada

Landforms of Blaine County, Montana
Landforms of Phillips County, Montana
Mountain ranges of Montana
Ranges of the Rocky Mountains